Riachão das Neves is a municipality in the state of Bahia in Brazil.

References

External links
citybrazil.com.br (in Portuguese)

Municipalities in Bahia